Tsinilla albidecora is a species of moth of the family Tortricidae. It is found in Carchi Province, Ecuador.

The wingspan is about 18.5 mm. The forewings are white, preserved as a postmedian blotch, tinged with cinnamon rust in some parts. The basal area is blackish brown with refractive bluish dots and brownish ochreous spots. The hindwings are greyish brown.

Etymology
The species name refers to the colouration of the forewings and is derived from Latin albus (meaning white) and decora (meaning decorated).

References

	

Moths described in 2008
Olethreutini
Taxa named by Józef Razowski